In organic chemistry, Bredt's rule is an empirical observation that states that a double bond cannot be placed at the bridgehead of a bridged ring system, unless the rings are large enough. The rule is named after Julius Bredt, who first discussed it in 1902 and codified it in 1924.   It primarily relates to bridgeheads with carbon-carbon and carbon-nitrogen double bonds.

For example, two of the following isomers of norbornene violate Bredt's rule, which makes them too unstable to prepare:

In the figure, the bridgehead atoms involved in Bredt's rule violation are highlighted in red.

Bredt's rule is a consequence of the fact that having a double bond on a bridgehead, carbons from which three bonds radiate and which the rings share a single covalent bond, would be equivalent to having a trans double bond on a ring, which is not stable for small rings (fewer than eight atoms) due to a combination of ring strain, and angle strain (nonplanar alkene). The p orbitals of the bridgehead atom and adjacent atoms are orthogonal and thus are not aligned properly for the formation of pi bonds.  Fawcett quantified the rule by defining S as the number of non-bridgehead atoms in a ring system, and postulated that stability required S ≥ 9 in bicyclic systems and S ≥ 11 in tricyclic systems.  There has been an active research program to seek compounds inconsistent with the rule, and for bicyclic systems a limit of S ≥ 7 is now established with several such compounds having been prepared.  The above norbornene system has S = 5 and so they are not preparable.

Bredt's rule can be useful for predicting which isomer is obtained from an elimination reaction in a bridged ring system. It can also be applied to reaction mechanisms that go via carbocations and, to a lesser degree, via free radicals, because these intermediates, like carbon atoms involved in a double bond, prefer to have a planar geometry with 120 degree angles and sp2 hybridization.  The rule also allows the rationalisation of observations.  For example, bicyclo[5.3.1]undecane-11-one-1-carboxylic acid undergoes decarboxylation on heating to 132 °C, but the similar compound bicyclo[2.2.1]heptan-7-one-1-carboxylic acid remains stable beyond 500 °C, despite both being β-keto acids with the carbonyl group on a one-carbon bridge and the carboxylate group on the bridgehead.  The mechanism of decarboxylation involves an enolate intermediate, which is an S = 9 species in the former case and an S = 5 species in the latter, preventing the decarboxylation in the smaller ring system.

An anti-bredt molecule is one that is found to exist and be stable (within certain parameters) despite this rule. A recent (2006) example of such a molecule is 2-quinuclidonium tetrafluoroborate. Bridgehead double bonds can be found in some natural products, discussed in a review by Mak, Pouwer and Williams, and an older review by Shea looked at bridgehead alkenes more generally.

References 

Physical organic chemistry
Stereochemistry